Qurbani Jatt Di (Punjabi: ਕੁਰਬਾਨੀ ਜੱਟ ਦੀ) is a 1990 Punjabi action film produced by Hemavati Sapru and directed by Priti Sapru.

Plot
Sucha Singh (Dharmendra) attempts to stop Joginder, who is the father of his sister-in-law, Jeeto (Priti Sapru), from sexually molesting Kamli, a physical confrontation ensues, resulting in the death of Joginder. Sucha is arrested, tried in Court, and sentenced to life in prison. Jeeto's three brothers Jora (Yograj Singh), Nara (Gugu Gill) and Dheera (Deep Dhillon) not satisfied with this, of deceased attempt to break-up Jeeto's marriage with Jagroop (Raj Babbar), and also prevent her look-alike sister, Preeto, from marrying Sucha's brother Karamjeet(Gurdas Maan), setting off a feud that will result in more acrimony, and many more deaths. Dheera (Deep Dhillon) shot Jagroop (Raj Babbar) with a gun and then Karamjeet (Gurdas Maan) beat him up and then Dheera (Deep Dhillon) got arrested and then went to the prison.

Star cast
Dharmendra ... Sarpanch Sucha Singh (friendly appearance)
Gurdas Maan ... Karamjeet (Karma)
Raj Babbar ... Jagroop
Yograj Singh ... Jora
Gugu Gill ... Nara
Priti Sapru ... Jeeto/Preeto (double role)
Mehar Mittal ... Mama
Deep Dhillon ... Dheera
Nirmal Rishi ... Bhua 
Anjana Mumtaz ... Kamli (friendly appearance)

References

External links
 

1990 films
1990 action films
Punjabi-language Indian films
1990s Punjabi-language films
Indian action films